Buttonwillow is an unincorporated community and census-designated place in the San Joaquin Valley, in Kern County, California. The population was 1,508 at the 2010 census, up from 1,266 at the 2000 census. The center of population of California is located in Buttonwillow.

History

The town was originally called Buena Vista when it was founded in 1895, but the name quickly became Buttonwillow.

Buttonwillow was named for the buttonbush (Cephalanthus occidentalis). A lone buttonbush served as a landmark on an old trans-valley trail and was used by ancient Yokuts Indian as a meeting place, later becoming the site of settlers' stock rodeos. The Miller & Lux holdings company eventually established a headquarters and store near the tree. This tree is listed as California Historical Landmark No. 492. This landmark is now known as the Buttonwillow Tree.
California Historical Landmark reads:
.NO. 492 BUTTONWILLOW TREE - This lone tree, which gave the town of Buttonwillow its name, served as a landmark on an old trans-valley trail. An ancient Yokuts Indian meeting place, it later became the site of settlers' stock rodeos. Miller and Lux established their headquarters and store here about 1885."

The first United States Post Office at Buttonwillow was established in 1895.

Facilities

Buttonwillow is a major stop for motorists traveling on Interstate 5. It includes gas stations including (Exxon, Shell, Chevron, and Arco), a McDonald's, a Carl's Jr., a drive-thru Starbucks, Willow Ranch BBQ restaurant, an Indian restaurant, Subway, a Mexican-Salvadoran restaurant, TravelCenters of America, Denny's, and Castro Tire & Truckwash. These are all at the exit of State Route 58.

There is a large electrical substation next to the town that is a part of a major north–south transmission corridor. It marks the northern end of Path 26 across the Transverse Ranges and the southern end of the Path 15 power lines. Buttonwillow is the motel hub for members of the Sports Car Club of America's Cal Club region when they hold events at Cal Club-owned Buttonwillow Raceway Park – a Super 8, a Motel 6 and the Homeland Inn are the motels of note there.

The town is also known for hosting the Best in the West jet rally, an annual gathering of model jet enthusiasts.

Buttonwillow's main industry is cotton farming.

Geography
Buttonwillow is also locally known as the cotton country, due to the abundant planting of cotton in the vicinity.

Occidental Petroleum bought the reserve from the U.S. Department of Energy in 1998, and is the current primary operator of the oil field.

Climate
Buttonwillow has a cold desert climate (BWk) typical of the southern part of California's Central Valley with hot, dry summers and cool winters.

Demographics

2010
At the 2010 census Buttonwillow had a population of 1,508. The racial makeup of Buttonwillow was 534 (35.4%) White, 36 (2.4%) African American, 11 (0.7%) Native American, 10 (0.7%) Asian, 0 (0.0%) Pacific Islander, 890 (59.0%) from other races, and 27 (1.8%) from two or more races. Hispanic or Latino of any race were 1,183 persons (78.4%).

The whole population lived in households, no one lived in non-institutionalized group quarters and no one was institutionalized.

There were 379 households, 225 (59.4%) had children under the age of 18 living in them, 217 (57.3%) were opposite-sex married couples living together, 64 (16.9%) had a female householder with no husband present, 39 (10.3%) had a male householder with no wife present.  There were 36 (9.5%) unmarried opposite-sex partnerships, and 1 (0.3%) same-sex married couples or partnerships. 46 households (12.1%) were one person and 29 (7.7%) had someone living alone who was 65 or older. The average household size was 3.98.  There were 320 families (84.4% of households); the average family size was 4.30.

The age distribution was 561 people (37.2%) under the age of 18, 162 people (10.7%) aged 18 to 24, 428 people (28.4%) aged 25 to 44, 265 people (17.6%) aged 45 to 64, and 92 people (6.1%) who were 65 or older.  The median age was 26.5 years. For every 100 females, there were 110.0 males.  For every 100 females age 18 and over, there were 111.9 males.

There were 406 housing units at an average density of 58.6 per square mile, of the occupied units 184 (48.5%) were owner-occupied and 195 (51.5%) were rented. The homeowner vacancy rate was 1.6%; the rental vacancy rate was 4.4%.  699 people (46.4% of the population) lived in owner-occupied housing units and 809 people (53.6%) lived in rental housing units.

2000
At the 2000 census there were 1,266 people, 328 households, and 270 families in the CDP. The racial makeup of the CDP was 34.28% White, 3.79% Black or African American, 1.66% Native American, 0.08% Asian, 55.06% from other races, and 5.13% from two or more races.  68.40% of the population were Hispanic or Latino of any race.
Of the 328 households 56.4% had children under the age of 18 living with them, 61.6% were married couples living together, 14.3% had a female householder with no husband present, and 17.4% were non-families. 15.2% of households were one person and 7.9% were one person aged 65 or older.  The average household size was 3.81 and the average family size was 4.25.

The age distribution was 38.0% under the age of 18, 12.6% from 18 to 24, 27.6% from 25 to 44, 13.4% from 45 to 64, and 8.3% 65 or older.  The median age was 24 years. For every 100 females, there were 107.2 males.  For every 100 females age 18 and over, there were 106.6 males.

The median household income was $28,370 and the median family income  was $29,716. Males had a median income of $19,514 versus $16,974 for females. The per capita income for the CDP was $9,424.  About 23.1% of families and 28.7% of the population were below the poverty line, including 35.4% of those under age 18 and 11.8% of those age 65 or over.

Environment

Buttonwillow, California, is the host to one of California's three toxic waste dumps: the Lokern Facility. It was created in the 1970s, without the notification of any of the county's residents. Furthermore, Highway 58, a busy road through the community, was used as the main route for trucks from the facility to transport toxic loads. At times, as many as 200 trucks would travel through the community per day.

According to a study performed by Lisa Schweitzer, “transport spills [from toxic waste transporters, such as trucks] generally cluster near origins more than destinations." In the study, Schweitzer observed the amount of toxic waste that is spilled during transportation and the area where spills are generally located. If intermodal facilities and transfer points are considered origins, Laidlaw Environmental would qualify. Furthermore, the hundreds of trucks that transport toxic loads travel in and out of the community every day. Given the results of Schweitzer's study, the residents of nearby communities (Buttonwillow, especially) are at the highest risk of experiencing side effects from the spills. Generally, spills occur as a result of human error, in which the load was packaged incorrectly or the driver experienced a vehicle accident or some other force which allowed for the leaking of toxins.

It was nearly ten years before the residents of Buttonwillow became aware of the facility. Even then, residents felt as if they could do nothing to stop it. Then in 1992, the birth and death of a child with a physical defect—anencephaly—stirred suspicion from several residents. The tragedy created a bond between these residents, and they began to look to Laidlaw Environmental and the toxins that it released as the root of the issue.

Also in 1992, Laidlaw Environmental proposed an expansion of its facility in Kern County. It wanted to double the dump's capacity, making it the largest in the United States. Furthermore, it wanted to change the types of chemicals it took from strictly petroleum waste to more than 450 different types of substances, many of which were highly toxic. According to Juanita Fernandez, a resident of Buttonwillow, those in attendance at the community meeting which discussed the proposed acts appeared to be businessmen and women who were mostly of a Caucasian background. The name of the committee in charge of the meeting was the Local Assessment Committee (LAC), which was formed in accordance with a law passed by California in the 1980s known as the Tanner Act. The law attempted to give county residents a say in the environmental occurrences and developments in their area. The LAC consisted of seven members, all of which met to discuss events and proposals such as those of Laidlaw Environmental.
Despite the apparent effort, the rules and regulations of the LAC were not fairly implemented. Even though LAC meetings were held in Buttonwillow, there were no residents from Buttonwillow on the committee. Furthermore, no members were of a Latino descent, although nearly all of Buttonwillow's residents belonged to this demographic group. While many Buttonwillow residents attempted to participate in meetings, there was no one in attendance who was willing to translate for Spanish speakers. Because the majority of Buttonwillow residents predominantly spoke Spanish, their presence at the meetings had little influence. Finally, in June 1992, a Spanish translator was provided at the meetings. One month later, the Local Assessment Committee was suspended indefinitely.

In September 1994, the committee was reinstated. During the two-year span, a draft and final Environmental Impact Report (EIR) was designed for Laidlaw Environmental. The EIR, required by the California Environmental Quality Act (CEQA), “examines the potential environmental impacts of many projects such as toxic waste dumps”. In addition, speculation surrounded the decisions that were made in appointing new committee members. Many people believed the decisions were made based upon race rather than qualification. In fact, a white applicant was chosen over a Latino, even though this applicant had failed to submit their application. Because of the tension, the LAC decided to appoint a Latino member, Eduardo Montoya.

After the application process, the LAC was told that it had ten weeks to convene and discuss the upcoming December hearing about the proposed expansion of Laidlaw Environmental. In this short amount of time, the LAC battled not with Laidlaw Environmental, but rather with the county. It appeared to many as if the county would not let the committee run their own meetings. The committee wanted control—the ability to set their own agenda and hire outside consultants. However, the county did not want to grant this authority to the LAC. Ten weeks later, in December, Laidlaw Environmental proceeded with the hearing and the Board of Supervisors disbanded the LAC. Montoya said that “the Board knew beforehand they would approve the dump” and that “they were just going through the motions”.

A major divider in the struggle of Buttonwillow against Laidlaw Environmental was the issue of race. While the LAC could have spent time gathering community support and increasing awareness about the toxins, the committee members were instead battling racial discrimination and a debate with the county about Spanish translation. A local community group, known as Padres Hacia una Vida Mejor, worked for these particular rights. Furthermore, the translation issue seemed to create a division among the county's residents. For example, in their efforts to institute Spanish translation of the EIR and public hearings, the Latino residents isolated themselves from the black and white people in the community. Many English-speaking residents did not support the translation and felt that speaking English was key if Latinos “wanted to live in [their] country”. Because of these divisions, a racial streak emerged in the community, further dividing the community and decreasing the strength of their resistance.

The struggles of the Buttonwillow community still persist, and even as the residents make progress, they also face additional setbacks. Many of the myths that are often disproved by similar environmental justice cases apply to Buttonwillow. One of the primary myths initially believed by communities facing environmental injustice is that the government is “on our side.” According to Luke W. Cole, this myth is shared more widely among white Americans than among minorities, probably because minorities have historically faced several levels of governmental injustice.

Notes

References

External links

Census-designated places in Kern County, California
Populated places established in 1895
Census-designated places in California
1895 establishments in California